Hugh Sinclair may refer to:

 Hugh Sinclair (1873–1939), former Director of British Naval Intelligence
 Hugh Sinclair (actor) (1903–1962), Hollywood film actor of the 1930s–'40s
 Hugh Sinclair (politician) (1864–1926), Australian politician
 Hugh Macdonald Sinclair (1910–1990), British nutrition researcher
 Hugh Sinclair (rugby union), Australian rugby player